Moštica is a village in the municipality of Makedonska Kamenica, North Macedonia.

Demographics
According to the 2002 census, the village had a total of 543 inhabitants. Ethnic groups in the village include:

Macedonians 543

References

Villages in Makedonska Kamenica Municipality